Chief Peteetneet, or more precisely Pah-ti't-ni't (pronounced Paw-tee't-nee't), was a clan leader of a band of Timpanogos that lived near Peteetneet Creek, which was named for him (or perhaps for which he was named), in what is now known as Payson, Utah, United States.

Description
His band was semi-nomadic, living in semi-permanent, grass-thatched, wattle-and-daub houses, and roamed throughout the Utah Lake area as well as Sanpete and Sevier counties.  Together with Chief Tabby-To-Kwanah, they led seasonal migrations through the canyon each spring and fall.  His daughter Pomona (Pamamaci = "Water-woman") married the mountain man, Miles Goodyear. Peteetneet is the anglicized corruption of Pah-ti't-ni't, which in Timpanogos means "our water place".

In February 1850, his village was attacked by the Mormon militia, as part of the Battle at Fort Utah.  Although Peteetneet  was not there at the time of the attack, he did confront the soldiers at Fort Utah after finding the bodies of several decapitated Indians.

When the first Mormon pioneers arrived on Peteeneet Creek in late October, 1850, they found that Chief Peteetneet was friendly, along with his band of about 200 Timpanogos. The Mormon pioneers settled on an uninhabited section of the creek about a mile southeast of Peteetneet's village. It is unlikely that the settlement on Peteetneet Creek would have survived the winter without the benevolence of Chief Peteetneet and his band.

Chief Peteetneet also enjoyed the support of Mormon leaders in the Indian slave trade.  Apostle George A. Smith gave him talking papers that certified "it is my desire that they [Captain Walker and Peteetneet] should be treated as friends, and as they wish to Trade horses, Buckskins and Piede children, we hope them success and prosperity and good bargains."

Chief Peteetneet died on December 23, 1861, under somewhat mysterious circumstances in Cedar Valley, Utah, near recently abandoned Fort Crittenden (Camp Floyd). He was buried on the mountainside in Cedar Valley by members of his band. His wife, murdered by an axe-wielding woman in his band on express orders near his deathbed, was buried in the valley below his grave in order to accompany him into the afterlife. He was succeeded at the time of his death in 1862 by a near kinsman named Ponnewats, a corruption of Pa-ni-wa-tsi, meaning "Little Master of Our Water".

A monument of Chief Peteetneet stands at the front of the Peteetneet Museum and Cultural Arts Center. The monument was sculpted by local artist, Brian Bird, in 1993.

See also
 Act for the relief of Indian Slaves and Prisoners
 Mormonism and slavery

References

External links
 

1861 deaths
Year of birth unknown
Mormonism and Native Americans
Native American leaders
People of Utah Territory
Timpanogo people
Slavery of Native Americans
American slave traders
History of slavery in Utah
Native American slave owners